Dioscorea transversa, the pencil yam, is a vine of eastern and northern Australia.

The leaves are heart-shaped, shiny, with 5-7 prominent veins. The seed pods are rounded, green or pink before drying to a straw brown papery texture. The edible tubers are typically slender and long. There are two forms: an eastern rainforest and wet sclerophyll form which doesn't have bulbils, and a northern form which occurs in open forests and has small bulbils and large inground tubers.

Uses
The tubers were a staple food of Australian Aboriginals and are eaten after cooking, usually in ground ovens. The 1889 book 'The Useful Native Plants of Australia records that common names included "Long yam", Indigenous Australians from Central Queensland referred to it as "Kowar" and that "The small young tubers are eaten by the aborigines [sic.] without any preparation."

References

External links
Royal Botanic Gardens & Domain Trust, Sydney, Dioscorea transversa
Plantnet New South Wales Flora Online, Dioscorea transversa R.Br. 
Atlas of Living Australia,  Dioscorea transversa R.Br. Common Yam Vine
Dioscorea transversa at Australian Tropical Rainforest Plants

Bushfood
transversa
Root vegetables
Monocots of Australia
Angiosperms of Western Australia
Plants described in 1810